Adnan Farooq Ahmed (born 7 June 1984) is a former footballer who played as a midfielder. Born in England, he represented the Pakistan national team. He had an 11-year career in football, including a six-year international career in which he scored four goals and won 27 caps.

Starting his career at Huddersfield Town in 2003, after three years he transferred to Tranmere Rovers. After a two-year spell which included loans to Mansfield Town and Port Vale, he signed with Hungarian club Ferencvárosi TC in 2009. A year later he moved to Iran to spend a brief period at Aboumoslem. He returned to England, and in October 2011 joined Bradford Park Avenue. He switched to Nelson in May 2012 and returned to Nelson after a brief spell with Droylsden in 2013. He helped Nelson to win the North West Counties League Division One title in 2013–14.

Early life
Ahmed was born in Burnley and lived in Barnoldswick, Lancashire during his early life, attending Moorland School in Clitheroe. Ahmed is a British Asian of Pakistani descent.

Club career

Huddersfield Town
Initially part of Bury youth academy, as well as a two-year stint at Manchester United Academy afterwards, Ahmed chose to join Huddersfield Town where he turned professional. Despite making a few appearances for the club in league and cup competitions since turning professional, Ahmed's career has been hampered by persistent injury troubles. Ahmed has the unfortunate distinction of being the very first player to be sent off at the Keepmoat Stadium, the new home of Doncaster Rovers. He was shown the red card for a two footed challenge on Rovers' Mark McCammon, the scorer of the very first goal in the stadium during Huddersfield's 3–0 defeat on 1 January 2007.

In January 2007, Ahmed went to Lincoln City, who had shown an interest in him, on a one-week trial with Huddersfield manager Peter Jackson saying "It will be a good experience for him and will hopefully make him appreciate what he's got here". However, no deal was done between the clubs and as a result the player returned to Huddersfield. He was released from the club in May 2007.

Tranmere Rovers
On 25 May 2007, it was announced that Ahmed had joined Tranmere Rovers side on a free transfer, becoming manager Ronnie Moore's first summer signing of 2007. He made his debut coming on as a substitute in the 2nd half at home in a 1–1 draw with Yeovil Town on 1 September 2007. However, competition for places in midfield saw him make just five further appearances during his debut season with the club.

Because of lack any real first team opportunities, Ahmed went on loan to Conference National side Mansfield Town at the end of October 2008, making his first team debut in a 2–0 defeat away to Torquay United on 1 November 2008. He became an instant hit with the Mansfield fans scoring a penalty in the 3–0 win against Salisbury City, also scoring a diving header against Weymouth to set up a 2–1 victory. Following his return to Tranmere, he joined Port Vale on trial. He went on loan to Vale on 21 January 2009. Ahmed opened his account with the "Valiants" by scoring the match winner in a 2–0 win at Macclesfield Town on 25 February 2009. He returned to Tranmere in late March after Vale manager Dean Glover rejected the opportunity to extend his loan, despite impressing fans with his performances.

Ferencváros
In July 2009, having impressed coaching staff during pre-season trial matches at Hungarian team Ferencvárosi TC, Ahmed signed a two-year deal with the team to play in Nemzeti Bajnokság I. He played his first competitive game for the team in a 2–0 win over Diósgyőri VTK in the 2009–10 Hungarian League Cup on 29 July 2009. After one season, he was released from the team having played a total of 20 games in all competitions with 1 goal in a 4–2 win against Kecskeméti TE in the Hungarian League Cup on 23 September 2009.

In July 2010 he went on trial at Scottish Premier League side Aberdeen, but was not offered a contract.

Aboomoslem
In September 2010, after taking part in training sessions and trials, Adnan was given a one-year contract with Mashhad-based Iranian club Aboumoslem for the 2010–11 Azadegan League season. He made his first team debut in a 1–0 home win over Iranjavan Bushehr on 7 October 2010. However, at the start of 2011, Adnan left the side and headed back to England as a free agent after playing just five games for Aboomoslem.

Nelson & Droylsden
Ahmed signed with Northern Premier League Premier Division club Bradford Park Avenue in October 2011. He scored a stoppage time winner on his debut, helping Avenue to defeat Chester 2–1 on 2 November. In May 2012, he joined Nelson in Division One of the North West Counties League. In November 2013, Ahmed rejoined Nelson after a short spell playing for Conference North side Droylsden. He helped the "Admirals" to the Division One title in the 2013–14 season. He made four appearances at the start of the 2014–15 campaign, but did not feature after mid-August.

However, Ahmed re-joined Nelson once again in January 2016. He balanced part-time football with working as operating director of his father's bedroom furniture company.

International career
Ahmed received his first formal call up to the Pakistan national football team for their World Cup 2010 qualification against Iraq on 22 October 2007 in Lahore, where he made his debut in a hefty 7–0 loss, and 28 October 2007 for the return leg in Aleppo, Syria which surprisingly finished goal-less between the two sides, although Iraq went through the next round on aggregate scores. Adnan scored his first goal for Pakistan in a humiliating 7–1 loss against Sri Lanka in the 2008 AFC Challenge Cup qualification.

Ahmed took part in the 2008 SAFF Cup where he scored a goal against arch-rivals India in a disappointing 2–1 loss and ended Pakistan's chances of going past the group stage. Ahmed scored two goals in 2010 AFC Challenge Cup qualification against Taiwan 1–1 draw and against Brunei 6–0 but in end they finished as 2nd and could not qualify for 2010 AFC Challenge Cup. He showed very good performance and skill. Ahmed also took part in the 2009 SAFF Cup hosted by Bangladesh, but it was again disappointment as Pakistan crashed out in the group stages once again; Ahmed playing two games in which he missed a late crucial penalty in the 1–0 loss against Sri Lanka. After missing out on the Pakistan squad for the 2010 Asian Games football tournament, Adnan returned to the senior team for the 2012 AFC Challenge Cup qualification Group B held in Malaysia where he played in all 3 games and starred in midfield despite Pakistan once again disappointing in another qualification tournament.

International goals
Scores and results list Pakistan's goal tally first.

Career statistics

Club statistics

International statistics

Honours
Nelson
North West Counties Football League First Division: 2013–14

See also
 British Asians in association football

References

1984 births
Living people
Footballers from Burnley
English people of Pakistani descent
British Asian footballers
English footballers
Association football midfielders
Pakistani footballers
Pakistani expatriate footballers
Pakistan international footballers
Pakistani expatriate sportspeople in England
British sportspeople of Pakistani descent
Huddersfield Town A.F.C. players
Tranmere Rovers F.C. players
Mansfield Town F.C. players
Port Vale F.C. players
Expatriate footballers in Hungary
Ferencvárosi TC footballers
Pakistani expatriate sportspeople in Hungary
Expatriate footballers in Iran
F.C. Aboomoslem players
Bradford (Park Avenue) A.F.C. players
Nelson F.C. players
Droylsden F.C. players
English Football League players
National League (English football) players
Nemzeti Bajnokság I players
Northern Premier League players